Poraqueiba is a genus of flowering plants in the family Metteniusaceae. It comprises 3 species native to Panama and South America.

References 

Metteniusaceae
Asterid genera